Georges Édouard Dandelot (2 December 1895 – 17 August 1975) was a French composer and teacher.

Biography
Dandelot was born in Paris. His father was Alfred Dandelot, and his mother was the daughter of a piano maker. Dandelot studied at the Paris Conservatory under Émile Schwartz, Louis Diémer, Xavier Leroux, Jean Gallon, Georges Caussade, Charles-Marie Widor, Vincent d'Indy, Maurice Emmanuel, Paul Dukas, and Albert Roussel. After serving in World War I, he began teaching piano in 1919 at the École Normale de Musique de Paris; from 1942 he taught harmony at the Paris Conservatory, and published treatises on solfege and harmony. Among his pupils were composers Paul Méfano, Michel Perrault, Rodica Sutzu, and Michel Philippot. 

He died in Saint-Georges-de-Didonne, Charente-Maritime.

Selected compositions

Orchestral works
Pax, Oratorio for vocal soloists, chorus and orchestra (1937) 
Symphony in D minor (1941) 
Concerto for piano and orchestra (1934)
Concerto romantique for violon and orchestra (1944)

Chamber music
String quartet
Trois valses, for 2 pianos
Sonatine, for flute and piano (1938) 
Sonatine, for violin and piano (1946) 
Sonatine, for trumpet (1961)

Ballets
 Le Souper de famine 
 Le Jardin merveilleux
 La Création (1948)

Operas
 L'Ennemi, opera in 3 acts
 Midas, opéra-comique bouffe in 3 acts (1948) 
 Apolline, operetta in 3 acts

References
Don Randel: The Harvard Biographical Dictionary of Music (Cambridge, MA, 1996), p. 195.

1895 births
1975 deaths
20th-century classical composers
20th-century French composers
20th-century French male musicians
Academic staff of the Conservatoire de Paris
Academic staff of the École Normale de Musique de Paris
Conservatoire de Paris alumni
French ballet composers
French male classical composers
French opera composers
Male opera composers
Musicians from Paris
Pupils of Charles-Marie Widor